Nysum is a locality in the region of North Jutland in Denmark.

Geography 
The locality is situated in the North Denmark, approximately 34 km (21 miles) away from North Denmark's capital Aalborg, and 211 km (131 mi) away from Copenhagen.

Culture 
In 2021, Nysum was home to a Rally X Nordic supercar race, featuring international drivers such as Johan Kristofferson and Fraser McConnell.

References 

Populated places in the North Jutland Region